"It Is What It Is" is a tautophrase, and an idiomatic phrase, indicating the immutable nature of an object or circumstance.

It may refer also to:

Music

Albums
 B.A.R.S. The Barry Adrian Reese Story or It Is What It Is, a 2007 album by Cassidy
 It Is What It Is (ABN album) (2008)
 It Is What It Is (Johnny Logan album) (2017)
 It Is What It Is (Thundercat album) (2020)
 It Is What It Is, a 1982 album by The Hitmen

Songs
 "It Is What It Is", a 1988 song by Derrick May from the compilation album Techno! The New Dance Sound of Detroit
 "It Is What It Is (What It Is)", a 1992 song by Adam Again from Dig
"It Is What It Is", a 1995 song by The Highwaymen from the album The Road Goes On Forever
 "It Is What It Is", a 2010 song by Lifehouse from Smoke & Mirrors
 "It Is What It Is", a 2013 song by Blood Orange from Cupid Deluxe
 "It Is What It Is", a 2013 song by Kacey Musgraves from Same Trailer Different Park
 "It Is What It Is", a 2016 song by Lecrae from Church Clothes 3
 "It Is What It Is", a 2009 song by Vic Chesnutt from At the Cut
 "It Is What It Is", a 2012 song by Uncle Kracker from Midnight Special

Other uses
 It Is What It Is, a 2001 film by Billy Frolick
 It Is What It Is, a 2007 autobiography by David Coulthard
 It Is What It Is: Conversations About Iraq, a project by Jeremy Deller
 It Is What It Is, a radio show hosted by Sean Baligian

See also 

 Fihi Ma Fihi (lit. It Is What It Is), a Persian prose work by Rumi
 
 What It Is (disambiguation)
 What is it (disambiguation)